The mammillary bodies are a pair of small round bodies, located on the undersurface of the brain that, as part of the diencephalon, form part of the limbic system.  They are located at the ends of the anterior arches of the fornix.  They consist of two groups of nuclei, the medial mammillary nuclei and the lateral mammillary nuclei.

Neuroanatomists have often categorized the mammillary bodies as part of the posterior part of hypothalamus.

Structure

Connections
They are connected to other parts of the brain (as shown in the schematic, below left), and act as a relay for impulses coming from the amygdalae and hippocampi, via the mamillo-thalamic tract to the thalamus.

Function 

Mammillary bodies, and their projections to the anterior thalamus via the mammillothalamic tract, are important for  recollective memory. The damage of medial mammillary nucleus leads to spatial memory deficit, according to observations in rats with mammillary body lesions.

Clinical significance
Damage to the mammillary bodies due to thiamine deficiency is implied in pathogenesis of Wernicke–Korsakoff syndrome.  Symptoms include impaired memory, also called anterograde amnesia, suggesting that the mammillary bodies may be important for memory.  Lesions of the medial dorsal and anterior nuclei of the thalami and lesions of the mammillary bodies are commonly involved in amnesic syndromes in humans.

Mammillary body atrophy is present in several other conditions, such as colloid cysts in the third ventricle, Alzheimer’s disease, schizophrenia, heart failure, and sleep apnea. In spite of this the exact function of the mammillary bodies is still not clear.

See also 
 Mammillotegmental fasciculus

References

External links 

 

Limbic system
Hypothalamus